Hilton Koch is a furniture dealer and store owner in Houston Texas at Hilton Furniture. Koch was the owner of the Houston Comets of the WNBA before they folded.

Houston Comets ownership
Koch bought the WNBA Comets from Rockets Owner Les Alexander in January 2007.

Shortly after the purchase team control was handed over to the WNBA. Hilton Koch “has not been able to devote the resources needed to maintain the Comets’ tradition of success.” However others argue that Koch "made a valiant attempt to keep the team in the city by purchasing the team from Houston Rockets owner Les Alexander" but was losing over 4 million dollars a year since buying the Comets. "Koch address (sic) the season-ticket holders in an open letter that was posted on the Comets website on August 8th Open Letter to Comets Fans. Dear Comets fans and supporters,

As you may have heard, the WNBA, Mayor Bill White and I are working diligently to find a new owner or ownership group for the Houston Comets. I wanted to take this moment to express my sincere gratitude at having had the opportunity to be an integral part of this storied franchise and thank you for the continued support that has made the Comets such an integral part of the wonderful Houston community.

As a longtime Comets fan and season-ticket holder, I understand and appreciate the significance of this team to the city of Houston and the WNBA. Since the league’s 1997 tip-off, the Comets have been core to the exponential growth of women’s basketball. By winning the WNBA’s first four titles, the team established itself as one of professional sports’ great modern dynasties and became a point of civic pride for Houston.

The fact that the energy, passion and commitment of Houston’s tremendous fan base no doubt ignited much of this success is something I was keenly aware of prior to purchasing the club. My tenure as owner has only served to enhance my longstanding admiration for the extraordinary atmosphere that takes over the stands at Comets games.

As we work to find an owner that will uphold the Comets’ tradition and guide this organization to great heights once again, please be assured that absolutely nothing about the experience of attending Comets games will change. The team is in the midst of a winning season and will be back home after the Olympic break to deliver more thrilling basketball action. Your support to date has led to an 11-2 home record, the second best such mark in the WNBA. The players will be counting on your energy and passion to help them secure a playoff berth.

Thank you for all the support that you have given the Comets before and during my tenure. My experience owning this team has been a great thrill, and I will continue to sit alongside you in the stands and cheer on our team.

Sincerely,

Hilton Koch  "Despite his losses, Koch is still trying to help with finding another buyer for the team."

Gallery Furniture vs. Hilton Furniture late night ads
In 2000, Conan O'Brien staged a competition on Late Night with Conan O'Brien between two of Houston's middle-of-the-night advertisers, Jim McIngvale ("Save You Money") from Gallery Furniture and chainsaw-wielding Hilton Koch ("That's a fact, Jack") from Hilton Furniture. Hilton Furniture won the Late Night battle of the ads contest, and O'Brien brought Hilton to New York to appear on Late Night as well as for "an advertiser makeover" from Foote, Cone & Belding. During this remote, O'Brien met his future wife Liza Powel, who was a copywriter with FCB.

Personal
Koch hails from the small town of Braithwaite, Louisiana near New Orleans. He attended Nicholls State University where he was president of Tau Kappa Epsilon fraternity.

References

Houston Comets owners
Living people
People from Houston
Women's National Basketball Association executives
Year of birth missing (living people)